The women's triple jump at the 2022 World Athletics Championships was held at the Hayward Field in Eugene on 16 and 18 July 2022. 28 athletes from 20 nations entered to the event.

Summary

Coming in to the Championships Yulimar Rojas held all the credentials, World Record, Check.  Olympic Champion, Check. Defending Champion, Check and Double Check.  World Leader, yes but in her two outings for the season, she nor anybody else had broken 15 metres.  Could there be weakness?

After jumping 14.60m in the first round, Rojas found herself in an unfamiliar second place behind a 14.89m new world leader from returning two time silver medalist Shanieka Ricketts. As the second jumper, in the second round Rojas settled it.  has only been bettered by one other person in history (that was the Championship Record by Inessa Kravets in 1995).  With first place virtually settled, the remaining athletes had to look at the other medals. Tori Franklin's first round 14.53m was third place until Leyanis Pérez jumped 14.70m to move up. The marks from Ricketts and Pérez held up until Franklin jumped 14.72m in the fifth round to finally claim bronze.  To finish things off, Rojas jumped 15.39m on the final jump of the competition, only the #9 jump in history.

Records
Before the competition records were as follows:

Qualification standard
The standard to qualify automatically for entry was 14.32 m.

Schedule
The event schedule, in local time (UTC−7), was as follows:

Results

Qualification 
The qualification round took place on 16 July, in two groups, both starting at 10:29. Athletes attaining a mark of at least 14.40 metres ( Q ) or at least the 12 best performers ( q ) qualified for the final.

Final 
The final was started on 18 July at 18:20.

References

Triple jump
Triple jump at the World Athletics Championships